{{safesubst:#invoke:RfD||2=Outline of heresy in the Catholic Church|month = February
|day = 23
|year = 2023
|time = 12:30
|timestamp = 20230223123024

|content=
REDIRECT List of heresies in the Catholic Church

}}